Endre Madarász (8 November 1909 – 5 May 1976) was a Hungarian athlete who competed in the 1932 Summer Olympics and in the 1936 Summer Olympics. He was born in Szerbittabé and died in Budapest.

References

1909 births
1976 deaths
People from Žitište
People from the Kingdom of Hungary
Hungarians in Vojvodina
Hungarian male discus throwers
Olympic athletes of Hungary
Athletes (track and field) at the 1932 Summer Olympics
Athletes (track and field) at the 1936 Summer Olympics